is a Japanese wrestler. He won a silver medal in the 60 kg freestyle wrestling class at the 2010 Asian Games.

References

Japanese male sport wrestlers
Asian Games medalists in wrestling
1988 births
Living people
Wrestlers at the 2010 Asian Games
Medalists at the 2010 Asian Games
Asian Games silver medalists for Japan
21st-century Japanese people